Glutaurine is an endogenous dipeptide which is an amide formed from glutamic acid and taurine.

Biological role

Glutaurine is an antiepileptic with antiamnesia properties. Glutaurine was discovered in the parathyroid in 1980, and later in the mammalian brain. This led to studies on intrinsic and synthetic taurine peptides, and the suggestion that γ-glutamyltransferase (GGT; γ-glutamyl-transpeptidase) in the brain is responsible for its in vivo formation.

The versatile molecule mimics the anxiolytic drug diazepam, and is implicated in phenomena from feline aggression to amphibian metamorphosis, radiation protection, and the glutamatergic system in schizophrenic disorders.

References

Sulfonic acids
Amino acid derivatives